Shaw Multicultural Channel (or simply Shaw Multicultural) is a Canadian ethnic cable television community channel, offering programming in 20 different languages. It is owned and operated by Shaw Communications, and is available on cable systems in Vancouver and Calgary regional markets. The channel operates on cable channel 4 in the Greater Vancouver region, on cable channel 10 in the Calgary Region and on Shaw BlueCurve TV channel 901 in those regions.

The channel was launched in 1979 as Rogers Multicultural Channel, under the ownership of Rogers Communications, and was available only in the Vancouver market on Rogers Cable. Shaw took over ownership and renamed the channel in 2000 following an asset swap with Rogers, which also saw Shaw become the primary cable television service provider in British Columbia. Service was subsequently extended to the Calgary market.

Despite the sale of Shaw Media and the Global Television Network to Corus Entertainment in 2016, the channel remains owned by Shaw.  The channel supports the work of local ethnic television producers and also covers and promotes cultural events in both Metro Vancouver and Calgary.

Programming Languages

References

External links
Official site

Multicultural and ethnic television in Canada
Canadian community channels
Shaw Communications
Television stations in Vancouver
Television stations in Calgary
Television channels and stations established in 1979
Multilingual broadcasters
1979 establishments in British Columbia